The Kansas City Cowboys were a National League baseball team that played one season in . They played at League Park and finished with a 30–91 record. They finished in seventh place, ahead of another new team, the Washington Nationals. They were not connected to the Union Association Cowboys.

The Cowboys were admitted to the National League on a trial basis for the 1886 season. The team went out of business in February, 1887, having been forced to sell its players back to the league for $6,000. They were replaced in the league by Pittsburgh, which moved to the league from the American Association.

See also
1886 Kansas City Cowboys season

References and external links

1886 Cowboys at Baseball Reference

Defunct Major League Baseball teams
Kansas City Cowboys
Defunct baseball teams in Missouri
Baseball teams disestablished in 1887
Baseball teams established in 1886
1886 establishments in Missouri
1887 disestablishments in Missouri